Sophia Steinbrenner (died 13 December 1933) was an American businesswoman. She was born as Sophia Minch; her parents were Philip and Anna Minch of Vermilion, Ohio. When Anna Minch died in 1905, Sophia took over Kinsman Transit (the family business), a large shipping concern, with her husband as general manager.  Their son, George M. Steinbrenner, became general manager when his father died in 1929.

She was the great-grandmother of George Steinbrenner, who owned the New York Yankees for many years.

In 1884, the Sophia Minch, a large schooner named after her, ran aground in Cleveland.

Footnotes 

1933 deaths
American businesspeople
People from Vermilion, Ohio